James Turner (December 20, 1766 – January 15, 1824) was the 12th Governor of the U.S. state of North Carolina from 1802 to 1805. He later served as a U.S. Senator from 1805 to 1816.

Turner was born in Southampton County in the Colony of Virginia; his family moved to the Province of North Carolina in 1770. Raised in a family of farmers, Turner served in the North Carolina volunteer militia during the American Revolutionary War in 1780. He served under Nathanael Greene alongside Nathaniel Macon, with whom he formed a lasting friendship and political alliance.

Politics 
In 1798, Turner was elected to the North Carolina House of Commons; he served there from 1799 to 1800, and served in the North Carolina Senate from 1801 to 1802.

Governor 

In 1802, the General Assembly elected John Baptista Ashe governor, but he died before he could assume office; Turner was chosen in his place and sworn in on December 5, 1802. He served the constitutional limit of three one-year terms and, at the end of his time as governor, was elected to the United States Senate when Montfort Stokes resigned before serving the term to which he had been elected.

U.S. Senate 
Turner served as a senator for eleven years, re-elected to a second term in 1811, resigning due to ill health in 1816. During his time in office, he supported the administration of James Madison during the War of 1812. Around 1805, he introduced to the Senate a bill outlawing the importation of slaves.

Personal life, death, legacy 
Turner was married three times; first to Marian Anderson in 1793 (they had four children), then to Ann Cochran in 1802, with no children, and finally to Elizabeth Johnston in 1810 (resulting in two children). Turner died in 1824 and is buried on his "Bloomsbury" plantation in Warren County. In addition to Bloomsbury, he owned a second home, "Oakland," in present-day Vance County.

His son Daniel Turner served in the US House of Representatives from 1827 to 1829.

Sources
 Biographical Directory of the Governors of the United States, 1789–1978, Robert Sobel and John Raimo, eds. Westport, CT: Meckler Books, 1978.
North Carolina Historical Marker  James Moody Turner
 Charles L. Coon, The Beginnings of Public Education in North Carolina: A Documentary History, 1790–1840 (1908) 
 Delbert H. Gilpatrick, Jeffersonian Democracy in North Carolina, 1789–1816 (1931) 
 William S. Powell, ed., Dictionary of North Carolina Biography, VI, 65—sketch by Roy Parker Jr. 

Governors of North Carolina
United States senators from North Carolina
Members of the North Carolina House of Representatives
1766 births
1824 deaths
North Carolina Democratic-Republicans
Democratic-Republican Party United States senators
Democratic-Republican Party state governors of the United States
18th-century American politicians
19th-century American politicians
People from Southampton County, Virginia
People from Warren County, North Carolina